was a village located in Shimajiri District, Okinawa Prefecture, Japan. Ōzato Castle is located here. It is named for the royal family of Nanzan.

As of 2003, the village had an estimated population of 11,648 and a density of 943.16 persons per km2. The total area was 12.35 km2.

On January 1, 2006, Ōzato, along with the town of Sashiki, and the villages of Chinen and Tamagusuku (all from Shimajiri District), was merged to create the city of Nanjō.

Dissolved municipalities of Okinawa Prefecture